Kazuya Maruyama may refer to:
 Kazuya Maruyama (politician)
 Kazuya Maruyama (baseball)